Michael Capuzzo (born May 1, 1957) is an American journalist and author best known for his New York Times-bestselling nonfiction books The Murder Room and Close to Shore He was formerly a reporter with the Miami Herald and the Philadelphia Inquirer, where he received four Pulitzer Prize nominations. The Murder Room, the true story of a private dining club of famous detectives who solve cold murders, and Close to Shore, an historic thriller and recreation of the first American shark attack in World War I-era New Jersey, both enjoyed wide acclaim from critics and authors such as Gay Talese, Mark Bowden, John Sanford, and Michael Connelly.   

Capuzzo was born in Boston, Massachusetts and raised in the Boston area before studied journalism at Northwestern University. He was a reporter with the Miami Herald for six years before joining the Philadelphia Inquirer where he worked from 1986 to 1994 before becoming a freelance writer. In 1997 he married Teresa Banik, a food critic for Philadelphia Magazine. Formerly a resident of Wenonah, New Jersey, in 2004 Capuzzo and his wife relocated to Wellsboro, Pennsylvania. In 2006 he and his wife founded Mountain Home, a monthly magazine serving the Twin Tiers and New York Finger Lakes regions. He earned an MFA in creative nonfiction from Goucher College in 2011, during which time he completed The Murder Room and was mentored by Pulitzer Prize-winning journalist Thomas French. 

The Murder Room, published in a number of countries, was one of five finalists for The Golden Dagger Award for Non-Fiction given by the British Crime Writer's Association for the best true-crime book by any writer of any nationality published in England in 2010/2011. A TV series based on the book was in development as of 2011, to be written by George Nolfi and produced by Carol Mendelsohn, of CSI: Crime Scene Investigation.

Capuzzo was interviewed several times on NPR about the book, including Fresh Air With Terry Gross, and the book was the subject of an ABC News prime-time one-hour special episode of 20/20 in September 2010. Capuzzo has appeared nationwide as a keynote speaker and at colleges talking about writing; at Rutgers University he taught Close to Shore as an honors colloquium, and the book was "The Big Read" at Coastal Carolina University.

Works
 The Murder Room: The Heirs of Sherlock Holmes Gather to Solve the World's Most Perplexing Cold Cases (2010).
 Close to Shore: A True Story of Terror in an Age of Innocence (2002)
 Mutts: America's Dogs  (with Brian Kilcommons) (2001)
 Cat Caught My Heart : Purrfect Tales of Wisdom, Hope, and Love (edited with Teresa Banik Capuzzo, 1999)
 Our Best Friends : Wagging Tales to Warm the Heart (edited with Teresa Banik Capuzzo, 1999)
  Wild Things: The Wacky and Wonderful Truth about the Animal Kingdom (1995)

References

External links

Mountain Home magazine

1957 births
21st-century American journalists
People from Tioga County, Pennsylvania
People from Wenonah, New Jersey
Writers from Pennsylvania
Living people
Northwestern University alumni
Goucher College alumni
21st-century American non-fiction writers